The river Arques is a watercourse located in the Seine-Maritime département of the Normandy region of north-western France.

Only 6 kilometres in length, the river is formed by the confluence of three rivers at Arques-la-Bataille: the Eaulne, the Béthune and the Varenne which drain the pays de Caux and the pays de Bray. The last part of its course takes it past the industrial zone of Rouxmesnil-Bouteilles and it then forms the waters of the port of Dieppe.

See also 
French water management scheme

References

Arques
Arques
Rivers of Seine-Maritime
0Arques